Soviet cuisine, the common cuisine of the Soviet Union, was formed by the integration of the various national cuisines of the Soviet Union, in the course of the formation of the Soviet people. It is characterized by a limited number of ingredients and simplified cooking. This type of cuisine was prevalent in canteens everywhere in the Soviet Union. It became an integral part of household cuisine and was used in parallel with national dishes, particularly in large cities. Generally, Soviet cuisine was shaped by Soviet eating habits and a very limited availability of ingredients in most parts of the USSR. Most dishes were simplifications of French, Russian, Austro-Hungarian cuisines, and cuisines from other Eastern Bloc nations. Caucasian cuisines, particularly Georgian cuisine, contributed as well. Canteens run by the government were called stolovaya.

In the West, Soviet cuisine is frequently conflated with Russian cuisine, though the particular national cuisine of Russia can be thought of as discrete.

Approach

An everyday Soviet full course meal (lunch or dinner) consisted of three courses, typically referred to as "first", "second", and "third"; an optional salad was not numbered (in the Russian cuisine, which largely formed a base for a Soviet one, salads belong to the separate zakuski course). In a restaurant, one could eat anything one liked in any order, but in a typical canteen, especially in a workers' or students' canteen, one would normally have received what was called a "combined lunch" (kompleksny obed). The first course was a soup or broth, i.e., "liquid" food (notice the difference from the Italian cuisine, where a "primo piatto" could also include a pasta dish — under a Soviet approach the pasta dishes belonged to the second course). The second was some kind of "solid" food: meat, fish, or poultry with a side dish, called "garnish". Garnishes typically included potatoes in a variety of forms, buckwheat kasha, macaroni, etc. Bliny, baked dishes ( zapekanka), or eggs could also be served as the second course (alternatively, dishes like deviled eggs may count as zakuski too). The third was theoretically a dessert, but in the simplified canteen cooking this usually boiled down to some substantial, often sweetened drink: tea, coffee, kompot, milk, kefir, etc.

Green vegetables and salads were seasonal, and with some exceptions (like sauerkraut-based ones, as sauerkraut was available year-round) uncommon at the table. Spices were rarely used, aside from moderate amounts of mustard and black pepper, and food had a generally mild taste. There were no differences between breakfast, lunch, and dinner meals. Lunch was always consumed with a soup as a first course. A tradition of a "fish day" on Thursdays, when fish or other seafood was consumed instead of meat, was started in State-run canteens and cafeterias to alleviate a shortage of meat, but nevertheless filtered to many private households. The common approach, which still somewhat holds today in Russia is: eat a lot at each meal, few times a day. Eat nothing between meals – the reason for this was that the State-run eateries in the Soviet time was largely under the control of doctors, and the medical wisdom at the time was that snacking between major meals would ruin the appetite (especially for children) and will lead to indigestion and intestinal distress. A typical lunch meal could consist of chicken-broth-based soup or borscht for a first course and fried meatballs or goulash served with boiled potatoes or buckwheat porridge as a main course. Butter or sour cream was typically used as a sauce.

Holiday meals were typically derived from old French and Russian cuisines with extensive use of heavy sauces, marinated meats, and melted cheese. Mixing ingredients and extensive cooking was common, just as in classic French cuisine. Generally, much effort was made in order to prepare such meals. Often, the richness of a holiday table was an issue of honor for the family.

Typical dishes

Zakuski and salads
 Olivier (also known as Russian salad)
 Herring under a fur coat
 Kholodets
 Vinegret (from French vinaigrette) - red beet root salad with onions, pickles, boiled potatoes, carrots, dressed with sunflower oil.
 Vitaminniy salat (Vitamin salad) - a cabbage-based salad with seasonal vegetables like tomatoes, cucumbers, onions, carrots, etc.
 Various pickles, such as cucumbers, tomatoes, ramsons, and mushrooms.
 Sauerkraut mixed with carrots and served as a salad.
 Morkovcha (also known as "Korean carrot salad") - a spicy carrot salad (a Koryo-saram dish).

First course
 Borscht - (Ukrainian)
 Chicken noodle soup
 Kharcho
 Okroshka
 Pacha - (Armenian/Azerbaijani/Georgian)
 Pea soup
 Rassolnik
 Shchi - (Russian)
 Solyanka
 Sorrel soup
 Ukha

Second course
 Beef Stroganoff
 Chicken Kiev (Russian) - a filled chicken cutlet
 Cutlet or meat ball
 Various kinds of dumplings, like pelmeni (Russian), vareniki (Ukrainian), or manti (Central Asian)
 Goulash, ragout, or another kind of stew
 Golubtsy - cabbage rolls stuffed with rice and meat and served in tomato sauce
 Plov (Central Asian) - rice dish
 Sausages
 Shashlik - (Caucasus)
 Jägerschnitzel (German)

Third course
Usually served in a  glass in common diners of obshchepit.
 Cocoa
 Coffee with milk (black coffee was an extra)
 Kefir (Turkic)
 Kissel (drinkable starch-based fruit jelly)
 Kompot (Slavic)
 Kvass
 Milk
 Ryazhenka (Ukrainian)
 Tea

Desserts
 Buns, biscuits, cookies, sushki
 Cakes (e.g. Kyiv cake, Napoleon, Medovik, Prague cake)
 Halva
 Pirozhki

Breakfasts
 Sausages
 Blini or Oladyi
 Various kinds of porridge, like buckwheat kasha with milk
 Syrniki

Street food
 Chebureki
 Pirozhki
 Shashlik
 Balyash
 Kvass

See also

 Russian cuisine
 Ukrainian cuisine
 Belarusian cuisine
 Uzbek cuisine
 Kazakh cuisine
 Georgian cuisine
 Azerbaijani cuisine
 Lithuanian cuisine
 Moldovan cuisine
 Latvian cuisine
 Kyrgyz cuisine
 Tajik cuisine
 Armenian cuisine
 Turkmen cuisine
 Estonian cuisine

References

 
Caucasian cuisine
Central Asian cuisine
Arctic cuisine
Cuisine
Historical foods